Universal Century technology refers to technology created in the fictional Universal Century timeline of the Gundam anime media mix.  Although they are only fictional technologies, they form a base that of the Real Robot genre of anime originates from. These technologies and their theory are now  influential to factual academic research. They have also influenced creations in other Animation series.

History 
Universal Century technology debuted in Gundam Century, written by editors, academy and studios hired by Out magazine at that time, later part of the book was endorsed by Sunrise and Bandai, and some of the authors of the articles within Gundam Century became official editors and writers of Gundam mechanics.  A main part of the book surrounds the discussion on real-life technologies including space habitats and mass driver.  Later, following the trend of militaristic and technological interest in the community, Gundam Sentinel Special Edition included a section called Imidam 0093 (Innovative Mobile Suit Information Dictionary, Annual Series, intentionally using an m at the end to reference Gundam), subtitled "Basic Knowledge of Gundam Mechanics".  Written by mechanical designer Katoki Hajime, summarized both in- and out-of-universe technologies of the Universal Century, sourcing from Gundam Century, Gun Sight, VF-1 Valkyrie, MS Graphical Guide 1~3, MSV Technical & History 1~3.  Gundam Officials has collected this information and has presented it along with plot history and character summaries in an encyclopedic form, and MS Encyclopedia 2003 has a short technical summary of these technologies in its first section before going into the lists of mobile weapons in different series, which earlier editions only have.

Cultural significance 
Although fictional technologies seems to carry no real-life significance, these technologies are referred to in almost all of the series of Universal Century.  They became a normal reference of the serial story and attracted publishers to publish books on them.  These technological settings have also since influenced a lot of anime and manga to have their own technological background to a certain degree.  Although it could be viewed as following the Star Wars trend, nothing similar has started before the 1981 publishing of Gundam Century.  Bandai (with its branch Sunrise) noticed the tradition and has hired writers to write articles for other Gundam series too.  In the Cosmic Era time line, one of the authors of Gundam Century articles (while still a high school student at that time), Shigeru Morita, who had become a regular employee of Bandai, was assigned to write these kinds of technological articles, possibly a method used by the company to attract Universal Century techno fans to watch the new series.  The series' technology is now serving as the inspiration for academic research in different fields, which could include moon settlements and mega-particle cannon.

The latest robot technology in Japan is also influenced by Gundam, due to its fictional technologies' being highly adapted from real-world science, and the Universal Century technologies including space colonies and mobile suits are also viewed academically as to what they can do in real life.

During the Tokyo International Film Festival 2015, Tomino first saw Minovsky particles as a dramatic device, "Because destroying enemies on the other side of Earth with missiles would not be dramatic, to make people meet and fight in space, ranged weapons have to be rendered useless." and claimed that he did not think of Engineering and Electronics at all.  While researcher (associate professor in the University of Tsukuba) and media artist Yoichi Ochiai viewed this in the science angle and said that even currently, if computers are not working right, things will get really weak, mixing in analogue in the machine is a correct choice and the setting is excellent.  Ochiai also mentioned the idea in his book "The Age of Magic" saying "The people using computers has a greater power of understanding", and admitted that this view is influenced by Newtype in Gundam.

Space colony

The space colony (precisely space habitat) technology in Universal Century is referenced from the real world projects proposed by Gerard K. O'Neill in his book The High Frontier: Human Colonies in Space.

In the Universal Century (U.C.) timeline, space colonies are placed at the five Earth-Moon Lagrangian points. In most cases, a Lagrangian point is home to more than one group of space colonies. Individual colony pairs are known as Bunches, and a group of colonies that occupy a Lagrangian point are known collectively as a Side. Because Sides sometimes share a single Lagrangian point, it is possible to have two Sides in close orbit to one another. Most colonies in the Universal Century are O'Neill "Island 3" type colony cylinders, yet a few early built Bernal sphere (Island 1) and Stanford torus colonies are still in function, but most are changed to space stations or discarded.  Side 3's colonies are identical in size and shape to the Island 3 design, but doubled the habitable area by removing the large window strips of the Island 3.

Mobile suit technology 
These technologies are the basic reasoning for the Universal Century's having mobile suits as the main battle units, replacing space fighters.  This has influenced later series to include their own reasoning to rationalize the existence of humanoid fighting vehicles.

AMBAC 
One of the most famous rationale being used is the Active Mass Balance Auto-Control (AMBAC) system, referenced also in various other series including Macross. Within the non-UC Gundam series, the AMBAC system term is also used in Mobile Suit Gundam 00.  The AMBAC system is a fundamental technology that allows for thrusterless manoeuvring in the zero-G environment of space by mobile suits by means of precise movement control of their limbs in the Gundam universe. AMBAC works by leveraging Isaac Newton's Third Law of Motion (when there's an action there is an equal and opposite reaction) with regard to inertia to effect changes in direction.  Mobile suits performing AMBAC motions would presumably move similarly to present-day astronauts performing extra-vehicular activity: both typically having roughly similar body structure, their use of that mass to control their rotation would presumably be similar, even if calculated by different means.  AMBAC is by its nature limited to re-orienting the unit about its center of mass, and is not a substitute for propulsion.  It is often used in conjunction with the propulsion system to quickly turn the unit and shorten aiming speed as well as directing the main thrusters.  The system is similar in principle to the momentum wheel system used in present-day satellites, though obviously more complex and allows the centre of mass move outside of the unit.

Tail Binder and Wing Binder 
Binders are technological instruments that provide extra control for the AMBAC systems. The idea is simple: "If four limbs can manoeuvre the unit better than none, why not equip them with 5 or more?"  The resulting advancement is the tail binder.

A cousin to the tail binder is the wing binder, equipped on most transformable mobile suits with waverider mode as wings. The system made use of the wings' mobility for the transformation during mobile suit mode as AMBAC limbs and further increasing the number of limbs for the AMBAC system. The tail binder is also seen on later models of military aircraft and space fighters in U.C.0088, on the FF-08 Wyvern.

Minovsky physics 

The Minovsky physics is the fundamental technological advancement in the Universal Century series, as all Beam weaponry (including the lightsaber-like Beam Sabers), nuclear technology and defensive measures are based upon this fictional physics.  According to the Gundam Century, MS encyclopedia 2003 and Gundam Officials, the Minovsky Physics all started from the invention of the then seemingly impossible idea of a nuclear fusion reactor that has a higher theoretical efficiency than classical physics, due to the Minovsky particle.

The Minovsky-Ionesco reactor was named after its fictional inventors, Dr. Y.T. Minovsky and Dr. Ionesco. This reactor was "radical" because it was the first "clean" nuclear reactor, emitting zero neutron radiation. The nuclear equation was:

  (energy released: 18.35 MeV)

This is essentially the same equation as used in classical physics, with the addition of the fictional Minovsky particle as a catalyst, instead of a muon.

Minovsky particle 
According to the official guide of Mobile Suit Gundam, Gundam Century and Gundam Officials, the Minovsky Physics Society, while working on the reactor, encountered a strange electromagnetic wave effect in U.C.0065 within the Minovsky-Ionesco reactor that could not be explained by conventional physics. The Minovsky particle has near-zero rest mass - though, like any particle, its mass increases to reflect its potential or kinetic energy - and can carry either a positive or negative electrical charge. When scattered in open space or in the air, the repulsive forces between charged Minovsky particles cause them to spontaneously align into a regular cubic lattice structure called an I-field. An I-field lattice will slowly expand and scatter into space; however, after dense interference it will take approximately 29 days before the region can support normal electromagnetic communication again.

The main use of the Minovsky particle was in combat and communication. When the Minovsky particle is spread in large numbers in the open air or in open space, the particles disrupt low-frequency electromagnetic radiation, such as microwaves and radio waves. The Minovsky particle also interferes with the operations of electronic circuitry and destroys unprotected circuits due to the particles' high electrical charge which act like a continuous electromagnetic pulse on metal objects. Because of the way Minovsky particles react with other types of radiation, radar systems and long-range wireless communication systems become useless, infra-red signals are diffracted and their accuracy decreases, and visible light is fogged. This became known as the "Minovsky Effect".

The disruption of electromagnetic radiation is due to the small lattice of the I-field creating fringes that long wavelengths cannot penetrate, and that diffract wavelengths that have similar distance with the fringes. This diffraction and polarization process disrupts the electromagnetic waves.

The only counter measure to the "M" particle in the series was to install bulky and expensive shielding on all electronic equipment, but only to counteract the effect it had on electronic circuitry. While this could be done for space ships and naval ships, this ruled out the use of precision guided weapons, such as guided missiles. Due to this, the military use of Minovsky particles ushered in a new era of close-range combat. This is the primary reason for the birth of the Zeon close-combat weapon: the mobile suit.

Minovsky ultracompact fusion reactor 
According to the timeline deduced by the Gundam Officials, in UC 0071, Zeon researchers created the Minovsky ultracompact fusion reactor. Instead of the conventional magnetic field, this improved version of the Minovsky-Ionesco reactor used an I-field to confine and compress the reactor fuel, triggering a fusion reaction. The Minovsky particles produced as a byproduct of the helium-3 fusion reaction were recycled to keep that reaction going. The Minovsky particles that form the I-field lattice also helped catalyze the fusion reaction, in a process similar to the muon-catalyzed fusion investigated by real-world scientists during the 1950s. This super-efficient design was only a fifth as large as an equivalently powerful Minovsky-Ionesco reactor; for this reason, it was adopted for use on mobile suits as the standard power plant.

Mega-particle cannon 
The fictional weapons of the Universal Century were described to be utilizing the degeneracy of the Minovsky Particle by compressing Minovsky particles in high pressure chambers and firing out the degenerated Minovsky particles (from the fusing of a positively charged and a negatively charged one) which carries high energy and mass from the degeneration of the matter.

Smaller versions of the mega particle cannon are presented in the series, the most famous being the Beam rifle used by the titular mobile suit RX-78 Gundam, which utilizes a technology called E-cap. The mobile suit does not need to spend much energy to compress the Minovsky particles; instead, most of the compression was done by the mother-ship and the mobile suit only needed to provide minimum energy for triggering the final degeneration energy.

E-cap technology appears outside of UC continuity in MS Saga: A New Dawn.

Beam smart gun 

According to Gundam Sentinel Special Edition, the beam smart gun is designed to bend the output beam by up to 20 degrees.  In the original Mobile Suit Gundam series, Char Aznable commented that the way to avoid a beam rifle is to avoid its being pointed at you.  As such, a gun that does not need to be pointed directly at the target is more dangerous.

Funnels 
Funnels are essentially funnel-shaped drone units that are designed to be remotely controlled by a Newtype pilot.  They are equipped with a small beam cannon and an energy cell to propel the funnel when it is operating.  A Newtype pilot is able to control these funnels with great precision via a psycommu system, allowing the user to conduct BVR attacks on a target from almost all directions without having to establish visual contact, making a funnel-equipped mobile suit extremely deadly.  When the funnels are not in use, they are attached to the mother suit's surface hardpoints for recharging.  All Zeon funnel-equipped units have the ability to recharge funnels, but the Earth Federation Forces were very slow in adopting the technology.

Later variants include Funnel missiles that are guided missiles using funnel-like remote control designs employed in the story Mobile Suit Gundam: Hathaway's Flash.

Cultural influence 

The new DACS (Divert & Attitude Control System) created by the Japan Self-Defense Forces in December, 2006 was quoted as an attempt to create a funnel system in real life by Gizmodo Japan.

Newtypes and related technologies 
The word  first came into being when Zeon Zum Deikun, the fictional character, founder of the space colony-based Principality of Zeon, created his philosophy: mankind was destined to leave the Earth for space, where they would experience a cognitive shift, and evolve into a kind of superhuman called the Newtype.

As Newtypes began to grow in number during and following the One Year War, the psycommu (psychic communicator) system was invented, which allowed these Newtypes to control wireless weapons known as bits and funnels, and even mobile suits, through thought alone. The device detects and amplifies the user's brainwaves, and a sophisticated computer system enables the user to manipulate weapons by using their mind.

The Psycoframe is a later technology that builds the psycommu into the nanomachines within the metal frame of a mobile suit. This allows a Newtype pilot to control the mobile suit as if it were his/her own body. A Psychoframe can project a Psychofield, which can happen when two Psychoframes are near, this Psychofield is a space where the human consciousness can manipulate the world regardless of the laws of psychics.

Other Newtype technologies are the Bio-Sensor system, the Quasi-psycommu system, the Neo-psycommu system, the Bio-computer, the EXAM System, the Angel Halo fortress, and the NT-D system.

Conventional weapons
Despite being set in the distant future, the Universal Century has several takes on modern weapons such as the twin gunned Type 61 main battle tank that bears a striking resemblance to the Israeli Merkava, the "Calt" M-72A1 assault rifle that is near identical to the British L-85, anti mobile suit weapons reminiscent of the BGM-71 TOW and Kornet, and even light utility vehicles similar to World War II era Jeeps.

References

Notes 
 Gundam Century, Minori, 22nd Sep, 1981.
 Gundam Century Renewal Version, ISBN / 4-87777-028-3, Kisousha, 15th Mar, 2000.
 MS Encyclopedia, ISBN / 4-89189-336-2, Bandai, 10th Feb, 1988.
 New MS Encyclopedia, ISBN / 4-89189-050-9, Bandai, 1st Oct, 1988.
 New MS Encyclopedia Ver. 3.0, ISBN / 4-89189-225-0, Bandai, 30th Jun, 1991.
 MS Encyclopedia 98, ISBN / 4-07-308519-0, Mediaworks, 15 May 1998.
 MS Encyclopedia 2003, ISBN / 4-84-022339-4, Mediaworks, Mar, 2003.
 Perfect Grade, Master Grade, High Grade Model Instruction Manual, Bandai.

External links 
 http://www.mahq.net/ has the line art of the weapons for most of the Mobile Suits.

Fictional technology
Gundam lists